Gener8Xion Entertainment, Inc. is a Christian independent film production company based in Hollywood, California. The company is a spin off from Trinity Broadcasting Network (TBN). The company was led by Matt Crouch (TBN) until mid-2010.

Filmography 
The Omega Code (1999)
Carman: The Champion (2001)
Megiddo: The Omega Code 2 (2001)
One Night with the King (2006)
Noëlle (2007) (distributor)
The Cross (2009)
Preacher's Kid (2010)

References

External links 
 Gener8Xion Entertainment, Inc.

Film production companies of the United States
Companies based in Los Angeles County, California
Christian film production companies
Trinity Broadcasting Network